Dahira kitchingi is a moth of the family Sphingidae. It is known from China.

References

Dahira
Moths described in 2000